Major-General Roger Evans  (9 January 1886 – 22 October 1968) was a British Army officer who commanded the 1st Armoured Division during the early stages of the Second World War.

Military career
Evans was born in Christchurch, Hampshire, on 9 January 1886, the son of Roger Evans. After serving in the Territorial Force, he was commissioned into the 7th Hussars in December 1911. He saw service in the First World War, in the Mesopotamian campaign, from 1917−1918.

After attending the Staff College, Camberley from 1920 to 1921, he then returned there, this time as a GSO2 instructor, from 1924 until 1927. He became Commanding Officer of the 5th Royal Inniskilling Dragoon Guards in 1929, followed by attendance at the Imperial Defence College in 1934, and a promotion to brigadier on the General Staff at Western Command in India in 1935.

He was appointed General Officer Commanding (GOC) of the 1st Armoured Division in 1938, continuing in that role into the Second World War with the British Expeditionary Force in France, before relinquishing the appointment on 24 August 1940. He was appointed GOC Aldershot Area on 13 March 1941, before being made supernumerary to the establishment on 9 January 1943.

He retired from the British Army on 13 October 1944.

Honours and decorations
Evans was awarded the Military Cross (MC) in 1918. His citation read:

From 1937 to 1947 he held the colonelcy of the 5th Royal Inniskilling Dragoon Guards. In the 1941 King's Birthday Honours, he was appointed Companion of the Order of the Bath (CB).

He was appointed High Sheriff of Somersetshire in 1955.

References

Bibliography

External links
British Army Officers 1939–1945
Generals of World War II

|-

1886 births
1968 deaths
5th Royal Inniskilling Dragoon Guards officers
7th Queen's Own Hussars officers
Graduates of the Royal College of Defence Studies
British Army generals of World War II
British Army major generals
British Army personnel of World War I
Companions of the Order of the Bath
Graduates of the Staff College, Camberley
High Sheriffs of Somerset
People from Christchurch, Dorset
Recipients of the Military Cross
Academics of the Staff College, Camberley
Military personnel from Hampshire